Sibi Malayil (born 2 May 1956) is an Indian film director who works in Malayalam cinema.

Career
Since the mid-1980s he has directed around forty films. He did his studies at the St. Berchmans College. Before becoming an independent director, he assisted eminent directors such as Priyadarshan and Fazil. Films such as Chekkeranoru Chilla (1986),  Thaniyavarthanam (1987), Vicharana (1988), Kireedam (1989), Dasharatham (1989), His Highness Abdullah (1990), Malayogom (1990), Bharatham (1991), Sadayam (1992), Kamaladalam (1992), Akashadoothu (1993), Chenkol (1993) and Sagaram Sakshi (1994) are defined the way Malayalam films were made, especially in the late 1980s and early 1990s. Many of his films have screenplays by A. K. Lohithadas. It was through his film Bharatham, that Mohanlal got his first national award for best actor. Sibi Malayil is also the president of the Film Employees' Federation of Kerala (FEFKA). He is also the chairman of a film institute named NEO Film School in Kochi.

Personal life

Sibi is married to Bala. They have a son Joe and a daughter Zeba. Sibi and his family are born again Christians

Filmography

 As Associate Director

 As Chief Associate Director

 As Director

Awards
National Film Awards
 1997 – Nargis Dutt Award for Best Feature Film on National Integration – Kanakkinavu
 1994 – National Film Award for Best Film on Family Welfare – Aakasadoothu
 1987 – National Film Award for Best Film on Other Social Issues – Doore Doore Koodu Koottam

Filmfare Awards South
 1991 – Filmfare Award for Best Director - Malayalam – Bharatham
 1992 – Filmfare Award for Best Director - Malayalam – Sadayam

Kerala State Film Awards
 2003 – Best Director – Ente Veedu Appuvinteyum
 2003 – Kerala State Film Award for Best film with popular appeal and aesthetic value – Ente Veedu Appuvinteyum
 2000 – Kerala State Film Award for Best film with popular appeal and aesthetic value – Devadoothan
 1996 – Second Best Film – Kanakkinavu
 1991 – Second Best Film – Bharatham

See also
List of Malayalam films from 1981 to 1985
List of Malayalam films from 1986 to 1990
List of Malayalam films from 1991 to 1995
List of Malayalam films from 1996 to 2000

References

External links

 

Film directors from Kerala
People from Alappuzha district
Indian Christians
Malayalam film directors
Living people
1956 births
Kerala State Film Award winners
Filmfare Awards South winners
Artists from Alappuzha
20th-century Indian film directors
21st-century Indian film directors
Directors who won the Best Film on Family Welfare National Film Award
Directors who won the Best Film on National Integration National Film Award
Directors who won the Best Film on Other Social Issues National Film Award